KDPI may refer to:

 KDPI (FM), a radio station (88.5 FM) licensed to serve Ketchum, Idaho, United States
 Democratic Party of Iranian Kurdistan